The Marie Luise Kaschnitz Prize (Marie Luise Kaschnitz-Preis) is a German literary prize, awarded approximately every two years by the Tutzing Protestant Academy Evangelische Akademie Tutzing. It recognizes the lifetime achievements of writers in the German language. The monetary value is €7,500.

The prize commemorates Marie Luise Kaschnitz, who died in 1974. The first award was announced on 14 October 1984.

Recipients 

 1984 Ilse Aichinger
 1986 Hanna Johansen
 1988 Fritz Rudolf Fries
 1990 Paul Nizon
 1992 Gerhard Roth
 1994 Ruth Klüger
 1996 Erica Pedretti
 1998 Arnold Stadler
 2000 Wulf Kirsten
 2002 Robert Menasse
 2004 Julia Franck
 2006 Pascal Mercier
 2008 Sibylle Lewitscharoff
 2010 Mirko Bonné
 2012 
 2015 Lutz Seiler
 2017 Michael Köhlmeier
 2019 Angelika Klüssendorf
 2021

References

External links 
 

Literary awards of Bavaria
Kaschnitz
Awards established in 1984
1984 establishments in Germany